Eassie Old Church is a ruined 13th-century parish church located near the village of Eassie in  Angus, Scotland. Erected in the corner of the church is the Eassie Stone, a Class II Pictish stone. The cross slab was discovered in 1850 in the nearby burn. The church was abandoned after 1835 when a new church was built in the area to serve the combined parishes of Eassie and Nevay.  Historic Environment Scotland established the site as a scheduled monument in 1921.

Description

Church

The roofless church sits on a small rise and is surrounded by a burial ground. It can be found near the village of Eassie in Angus Scotland. The building is rectangular in design,  measuring  x . Surviving in its original layout, it was mostly rebuilt in the late 16th century. The west doorway in the south wall is 18th century, but the eastern doorway is original.

The church was initially constructed in red sandstone rubble blocks and slabs. The surviving walls have been repaired with concrete and brick. The west gable of the church holds a large two-stage bellcote, constructed from ashlar sandstone. It is topped with a flat stone slab that is capped by a ball finial and weather vane. The south wall has a Victorian burial enclosure with tall metal railings. The east gable has a first storey rectangular doorway that probably was an entrance to a gallery or loft. 

The church interior has been divided into three separate areas. At the east end of the church stands a large Pictish cross slab enclosed within a protective enclosure. On both the interior and the exterior of the church, several gravestones are standing upright around the walls. The surrounding cemetery includes many old gravestones, including several tablestones, whose legs have been laid on their sides.

Cross slab

The Eassie sculpted stone is a Class II symbol stone and one of the oldest surviving Pictish cross-slabs in the United Kingdom, dating to the late AD 600s. It is excellent condition for its age with most of the stone's details still visible. The stone was discovered in the 18th century at the bottom of the burn which runs close to the church. It was later moved to its present location. 

The well-preserved face of the stone consists of a large cross with an intricately carved interlace pattern. Above and below the cross are two angels, a warrior, as well as real and mythical animals. The slab's reverse side, more damaged and weathered than the front, contains a mixture of carved figures and Pictish symbols. The carved images include a damaged Pictish beast over a double disc and Z-rod. Also on the reverse side are images of three Picts wearing cloaks and carrying spears.

History
The church dedicated to St Brandon, was on record in the 13th century. Most of the surviving remains date to the late 16th century. The parishes of Eassie and Nevay were combined in 1600. In 1835, a new church was built at a location convenient to both former parishes and the old churches were abandoned. Historic Environment Scotland established the site as a scheduled monument in 1921.
The protected monument encompasses the remains of the church and cross slab as well as the close area that surrounds them.

See also
Nevay Church
Kirriemuir Sculptured Stones
Hilton of Cadboll Stone

References

Buildings and structures in Angus, Scotland
History of Angus, Scotland 
Scheduled Ancient Monuments in Angus